Gwenlyn Cumyn is a Canadian actor, writer, and producer.  Her notable projects include the web television series Barbelle and Slo Pitch.

Personal life 
Cumyn lives in Toronto, Ontario, and identifies as bisexual and queer. Cumyn is a graduate of the George Brown Theatre School.

Cumyn has stated that it was in part due to a lack of quality queer representation that lead to the creation of her web series Barbelle.

Career 
As an actor, Cumyn has guest starred in Saving Hope, Paranormal Witness, and Forbidden: Dying for Love. In 2014, Cumyn appeared as Phebe in the Canstage production of As You Like It.

In 2015, she starred as Valentine in the feature film Chasing Valentine. She won the award for Best Actress in a Feature Film at the Milan International Filmmaker Festival for her performance in Chasing Valentine.

As a writer, Cumyn has worked on Barbelle (KindaTV), co-created with Karen Knox, and Slo Pitch, also co-created with Knox and J Stevens, as well the CBC Gem series, Homeschooled. Cumyn co-wrote and starred in the short film Cons & Pros with Knox, which debuted on VICE.com in January 2020.

Filmography

References

Living people
Year of birth missing (living people)